Container (29B6) radar is the new generation of Russian over-the-horizon radar, providing long distance airspace monitoring and ballistic missile detection. The first radar, near Kovylkino, Mordovia, Russia, became operational in December 2013 and entered combat duty on 1 December, 2019. Another Container radar is planned to be deployed in Kaliningrad.

Description
The radar can monitor the airspace up to 100 km altitude and has a 3,000 km range. It was developed by NPK NIIDAR, which is also a developer of Voronezh-DM radar. The chief designer was Valentin Strelkin, and the system's price was 10 billion rubles.

The system consists of two separate antenna arrays: one for the transmitter and one for the receiver. The receiver antenna array contains 144 antenna masts, each 34 m high. The array has three sections: The inner section is 900 m wide with a 7 m spacing between masts, and the two outer sections are each 200 m wide with a 14 m spacing. The total array width is 1,300 m. The receiver station has three arrays, arranged in an equilateral triangle. The transmitter antenna array has 36 re-configurable masts and is 440 m wide.

Radar signals were detected by some amateur radio operators in the 9.2–19.745 MHz frequency band. Pulse repetition rate is 50 pulses per second, bandwidth about 14 kHz, frequency modulation on pulse (FMOP) is used. The received signal has a sound similar to the Soviet early warning system Duga radar operated from 1976–1989, nicknamed "the Russian woodpecker".

Location
The receiving antennas are located 8 km south-west from Kovylkino, Mordovia, Russia  .
The transmitters' antennas were initially located 300 km from the receiver, 5 km north of Gorodets town, Nizhegorodskaya oblast', Russia
. The site has been dismantled since at least February 2018, the new receivers are now located 15 km to the southeast . The system is aligned on a bearing of 095 and 275 degrees to monitor airspace west of Russia, the Mediterranean Sea, and the Black Sea region.

References

External links 
 

Russian and Soviet military radars
Over-the-horizon radars
NIIDAR products
Early warning systems
Military equipment introduced in the 2010s